Leena Manimekalai is an Indian filmmaker, poet and an actor. Her works include five published poetry anthologies and a dozen films in genres, documentary, fiction and experimental poem films. She has been recognised with participation, mentions and best film awards in many international and national film festivals.

Films and activism

After a brief period as an assistant director with mainstream filmmakers and an intensive experience as a Television Producer and Anchor, she debuted in 2002 with the short documentary film Mathamma. The 20-minute-long docu-fiction is about devoting girl children to the deity, a practice prevalent among the Arundhatiyar community in Mangattucheri village near Arakkonam, Chennai. Her other films too deal with the issues of the marginalised. Parai is a film on violence against Dalit women. She went on the road with her films across hundreds of villages serving her videos a tool for participatory dialogue with the masses on compelling issues.

Break the Shackles is about the effects of globalisation on rural Tamil villages.

Love Lost is about changing relationships in urban space. It is an experimental five-minute video poem from her anthology.

Connecting Lines, which she did soon after she changed her style of film-making from "activistic" to "artistic", is about student politics in India and Germany. The documentary weaves through the student lives of four protagonists, two each in India and Germany.

Waves After Waves explores how art rejuvenates the lives of children, devastated by the 2004 tsunami at the coastal villages of Tamil Nadu. Leena was inspired to do this project while she was serving as a volunteer in tsunami-hit regions of Tamil Nadu doing art therapy workshops for children. Altar is a documentary intervention on child marriage customs prevailing in the Kambalathu Naicker community in the central parts of Tamil Nadu.

A Hole in the Bucket takes a look at the dynamics of water crisis in the city of Chennai in the context of families with different income levels. A Hole in the Bucket was showcased at International Water Symposium, Stockholm, 2007. Goddesses follows the lives of three extraordinary women who go against norms to succeed in usually male-oriented careers: a fisherwoman, a gravedigger and a funeral singer and it won her the prestigious Golden Conch at the Mumbai International Film Festival, 2008.

Manimekalai has taken up a visual art fellowship with PSBT on Tamil Women Poetry and Desire through the ages of Sangam, Medieval and Modern periods. "My Mirror is the Door" is her visual quest into the Sangam Age Tamil Women Poetry in which she traces her roots as a modern Tamil poet. IAWRT (International Association of Women in Radio and Television) awarded her with a fellowship to make a video portrait "Still I Rise" on Dayamani Barla, the first Indigenous Adivasi woman journalist who turned into a dynamic political leader in Jharkhand.  Her specialisation is on "Media and Conflict resolution" and she had been a European Union Scholar in art practice. She has Commonwealth Fellowship to her credits for "Woman in Cinema" and been a Charles Wallace Scholar with School of Oriental and African Studies, University of London.

Leena has expressed opposition to censorship in Indian cinema: "CBFC is an archaic institution and it has to go. It is as simple as that. It is such a sore in the skin of democracy. I do not know when filmmakers will realise the very existence of CBFC is an insult to our sensibilities and collectively come together to bring it down. The 1952 Cinematograph Act has to be challenged if we think we are not stupid."

Sengadal

Leena's first feature film Sengadal completed production in 2011. The film shows how the ethnic war in Sri Lanka affected the lives of fishermen in Dhanushkodi. The censor board initially refused clearance certificate to the film, stating that it made denigrating political remarks about the governments of Sri Lanka and India, and uses unparliamentary words. She had appealed to the Appellate Tribunal authorities and contested the case legally for several months and finally got it cleared by July 2011 without any cuts.

White Van Stories

Leena Manimekalai's White Van Stories is a 70-minute documentary feature on enforced disappearances in Sri Lanka inspired by voices of those in search of their loved ones.  Leena has a fresh set of challenges at her hand. She is now trying to get across the documentary, shot undercover in parts evading the constant gaze of the military, to a global audience. Leena was inspired to work on the subject of enforced disappearances when she visited Sri Lanka for a literary festival (41st Ilakkiya Santhippu) in July, and stayed back to travel. The stories she heard of people searching for their loved ones, thousands of whom vanished in the last stage of war in 2009, moved her to make the film.

Leena filmed the historical protests of the families of the disappeared in Jaffna and Colombo who were asking for justice, truth and reparation, declaring "No Peace" until their loved ones return. And She followed seven women who shared their stories across the east, south and north provinces. Access was incredibly challenging. North of Sri Lanka is heavily militarised and this is a story that had been largely impenetrable to the media as enforced disappearances also include journalists who are considered even slightly critical of state and its policies. Ultimately the film had to be made under severe vigilance and intimidation by the Lankan military. On one occasion Leena was asked to leave the country and on another detained for hours of questioning at a check post where they confiscated her tapes and denied her permission to film.

Personal life
Leena identifies as bisexual and came out in her second poetry collection, Ulagin Azhagiya Muthal Penn (The Most Beautiful First Woman in the World).

Support for LGBT and Pride march

Leena Manimekalai along with Anjali Gopalan supported the Asia's first Genderqueer Pride Parade organised by Gopi Shankar Madurai of Srishti Madurai in July 2012. Leena is the author of Antharakanni, the first poetry collection in Tamil on lesbian love. Springing from Tamil folklore, her twilight poems are enchanting with lesbian sensuality. Along with her poems, it has free hand translations of "balaclave" poems of Pussy Riot, the feminist punk band of Russia whose rioters are right now in prison on 'sedition' charges which adds a guerrilla status to the anthology. A Tamil version of openly bisexual Afro American poet June Jordan's cult verse 'About my rights' is another highlight of Antharakanni.

In 2016, she directed a documentary about the troubles faced by two transgender women while they look for a rental apartment in Chennai and the obstacles. It is titled "IS IT TOO MUCH TO ASK?" and was first screened on 21 November 2016, and later many other film festivals all over the world.

Filmography

Director

Actor

Publications

Poem collections

Awards and achievements

 2004: Retro – Ethnographic Montages, Chicago Women in Director's Chair International Film Festival
 2004: Silver Trophy for the Best Documentary in Europe Movies Film Festival
 2005: Best Actor and Best Experimental Video in Independent Art Film Festival
 2005: Best Documentary in Paris and Norway Independent Diaspora Festivals
 2005: European Union Fellowship for Conflict Resolution in Media
 2005: Retrospective, International Democratic Socialist Youth Film Festival, Venezuela
 2006: International Jury in Asian Film Festival, Malaysia
 2007: Jury Award for Best Cinema of Resistance – John Abraham National Award
 2008: Golden Conch for Best International Documentary in Mumbai International Film Festival
 2008: Visiting Scholar Fellowship, Berlinale
 2008: Nomination to Horizon Award, Munich International Film Festival
 2008: Nomination – Asia Pacific Screen Awards, Brisbane
 2008: One Billion Eyes National Award – Best Documentary
 2008: Commonwealth Scholarship and Fellowship Plan, Birds Eye View Film Festival, London
 2008: Iyal Best Poetry Award from The Tamil Literary Garden for Ulakin Azhakiya Muthal Penn
 2011: Sirpi Literary Award for the contribution to Tamil Poetry
 2011: Indian Panorama Selections for Sengadal
 2011: NAWFF Award for Best Asian Women Cinema (Tokyo) – Sengadal
 2012: As Jury, International Women Film Festival, Seoul.
 2013: Lenin Award from Thamizh Studio (instituted in the name of film editor B. Lenin) who highlights social issues.
 2014: Srishti Tamil Lambda Literary Award for her book "Antharakanni" conferred by Bracha Ettinger and Anjali Gopalan Advisory Board of Srishti Madurai
 2015: L’Oreal Paris Femina Women Awards 2015

Row over Kaali poster
Leena Manimekalai was on the receiving end of significant backlash and threats of violence after posting an image of the Hindu goddess Kaali as a poster for her documentary film Kaali on her twitter account. The image contained a picture of Manimekalai in costume as the goddess Kali smoking a cigarette with the rainbow gay pride flag. Canada’s Aga Khan Museum, where the film had been presented once on July 2, issued a statement expressing regret that the tweet "inadvertently caused offence".

See also
 List of Indian documentary filmmakers

References

Sources

External links

 
 Leena Manimekalai's official blog
 

Living people
Indian LGBT rights activists
Indian documentary filmmakers
Film directors from Chennai
Tamil film directors
Indian women film directors
21st-century Indian women artists
Women artists from Tamil Nadu
21st-century Indian film directors
Women writers from Tamil Nadu
Poets from Tamil Nadu
21st-century Indian poets
Indian women poets
Indian Tamil people
Screenwriters from Chennai
Indian women screenwriters
Film producers from Chennai
Indian women documentary filmmakers
21st-century Indian women writers
21st-century Indian screenwriters
Year of birth missing (living people)